In the 2020s private equity firms needed to respond to the COVID-19 recession. In the early 2020s private equity funding exploded. Private equity firm Silver Lake was involved in the costly Acquisition of Twitter by Elon Musk. The World Economic Forum suggested Private Equity would fund the revival of the economy after the recession

References

2020s economic history
History of banking
History of private equity and venture capital
Economic impact of the COVID-19 pandemic